{{DISPLAYTITLE:C15H25N3O}}
The molecular formula C15H25N3O (molar mass: 263.38 g/mol, exact mass: 263.1998 u) may refer to:

 Caproxamine
 Lisdexamfetamine, brand name Vyvanse

Molecular formulas